The second season of the Durarara!! anime series, titled Durarara!!×2, was directed by Takahiro Omori and produced by Shuka. The episodes are adapted from the light novel series Durarara!! by Ryōgo Narita and Suzuhito Yasuda. It continues from the events in the first television series Durarara!!, and is broken into three episode groups called "cours", or quarters of a year. The first cour aired from January to March 2015; the second cour aired from July to September 2015; and the third cour aired from January to March 2016.

Crunchyroll has announced it would stream the series in North America, Central America, South America, Ireland, and the United Kingdom. Aniplex of America licensed the series and is streaming an English dub via Crunchyroll and Hulu. For the first cour, the opening theme is "Headhunt" by Okamoto's, and the ending theme is "Never Say Never" by Three Lights Down Kings. For the second cour, the opening theme is "Day You Laugh" by Toshiyuki Toyonaga, and the ending theme is "Exit" by Revalcy. For the final cour, the opening theme is "Steppin' Out" by FLOW, and the ending theme is "Joker ni Yoroshiku" by PENGUIN RESEARCH.

Episode list

References

Durarara!!
2015 Japanese television seasons
2016 Japanese television seasons